Agonopterix iharai is a moth in the family Depressariidae. It was described by K. Fujisawa in 1985. It is found in Japan.

The larvae have been recorded feeding on Salix miyabeana.

References

Moths described in 1985
Agonopterix
Moths of Japan